Basiothia medea, the small verdant hawk, is a moth of the family Sphingidae. It is common in open habitats throughout the Ethiopian Region, including Madagascar. It is however probably absent from the equatorial forest belt, except as a vagrant. The species is an active migrant.

The length of the forewings is 22–25 mm and the wingspan is 49–63 mm. The body is grass green. The forewings are grass green with two or three faint darker green transverse lines. The hindwings are dull orange with a narrow brown margin.

The larvae feed on Spermacoce natalensis, Dioda, Spermacoce, Pentas and Pentasinia species.

References

Basiothia
Moths described in 1781
Moths of Africa
Moths of the Comoros
Moths of Madagascar
Moths of Réunion
Moths of the Middle East